Thomas Kyle Dang (born April 7, 1995) is a Canadian politician who was elected in the 2015 Alberta general election to the Legislative Assembly of Alberta representing the electoral district of Edmonton-South West. Dang is the youngest MLA to ever be elected in Alberta. He currently sits as an independent MLA.

Dang was a member of the first Alberta NDP Government Caucus in the province's history. During his first term, Dang advocated heavily for the new South-West high school and hospital, both of which were announced during his tenure. He also put forward motions related to education and most notably, changes to daylight saving time in Alberta.

In April 2019, Thomas Dang was re-elected to the Legislative Assembly of Alberta in the new electoral district of Edmonton-South, defeating the United Conservative Party candidate Tunde Obasan by a narrow margin. On December 21, 2021, Dang resigned from the NDP caucus after an RCMP search of his home. The search was later linked to a hack on the Alberta government vaccine information website, which, according to Dang, he conducted to highlight security flaws in the site. The Alberta Government eventually introduced a public vulnerability disclosure program for cybersecurity. Ultimately, Dang pled guilty and was fined $7,200 in November 2022.

Early life and education 
Dang was born and raised in Edmonton, Alberta. He is the second child of Chinese parents, who were refugees from Vietnam.

Education 
Before entering politics, Dang was pursuing a degree in Computing Science at the University of Alberta. In 2022, he completed a Bachelor of Science in Cybersecurity and Information Assurance from Western Governors University. He has also completed a University Certificate in Computing and Information Systems from Athabasca University. Dang has previously worked as a software consultant and software developer.

Professional Certifications 
Dang holds a number of technical and professional certifications:

 ISACA Certified Information Security Manager
 Offensive Security Certified Professional
 Cloud Security Alliance Certificate of Cloud Security Knowledge
 CompTIA A+, Network+, Security+, and CySA+
 ITIL 4 Foundations
 Google IT Support Professional

Political career

Dang entered politics as a candidate for the New Democratic Party of Alberta. He served as a member of the Standing Committee on the Alberta Heritage Savings Trust Fund, the Special Standing Committee on Members' Services and the Standing Committee on Resource Stewardship. He also previously served as a member of the Standing Committee on Private Bills.

Dang is seen as a rising star among his caucus; education minister David Eggen called Dang a strong pick as a future education minister due to his leadership and as a role model for young people.

In December 2020, Dang was named as Alberta's Best Representative of Constituents by his legislature colleagues.

Early career 
Dang was a computer science student at the University of Alberta. He also wrote a blog on provincial politics. He defeated incumbent Progressive Conservative MLA Matt Jeneroux in the May 5, 2015 election that saw the Alberta NDP sweep the city of Edmonton and win a majority government, the first switch of governing parties in the province since the 1971 election. As of 2014–2015, he is a member of the Delta Upsilon fraternity at the University of Alberta.

Official Opposition 
In his second term, Dang is part of the Alberta NDP Official Opposition. He serves as the Official Opposition Infrastructure Critic and Democracy and Ethics Critic. In February 2021, he was appointed Official Opposition Deputy House Leader.

During his time in opposition, he has been a vocal critic against misuse of funds, including bringing forward motions to investigate spending scandals and errors of Government MLAs.

Democracy and Ethics Critic 
Dang opposed a motion that granted UCP MLA Joseph Schow a $12000 raise in October 2021. He called the move to increase a politicians pay "absurd" and "hypocritical" while the Government is asking front-line and public sector workers for a wage rollback.

In November 2021, Dang sent a letter to Elections Alberta requesting an independent review of the use of third-party money to purchase tickets to the United Conservative Party annual general meeting.

Infrastructure Critic

Hospitals 
In May 2017, the Alberta Government announced a new hospital in southwest Edmonton. The location was chosen in part due to its proximity to both Anthony Henday Drive and the Queen Elizabeth Highway 2 (Alberta). The location is also near a proposed future LRT expansion. This decision was in part due to advocacy by Dang and he was on hand for the announcement.

Dang has been critical of the UCP Government for not fully funding the proposed Red Deer Hospital.

Schools 
In November 2017, Premier Rachel Notley and Education Minister David Eggen announced with Dang a new high school for the southwest region of Edmonton. The province announced the new high school will have space for 1800 students and was in response to the dramatic growth in that part of the city. It will be the first high school the city has seen in over 12 years.

Dang had been advocating for the school for several years and engaged with families, parent councils, and stakeholders over their clear need for a new high school.

Dang also advocated for parents and students experiencing issues with the Public–private partnership schools built in the Edmonton area. The schools have experienced issues with drainage issues leading to mud pits and large fences installed by the contractor. Dang has asked questions in Question Period of both the Education Minister and Infrastructure Minister and received commitments from the Government to work on resolving the issue.

While in opposition and as infrastructure critic, he has continued to advocate for communities and pushed against Government plans to increase the use of P3 projects.

Earplug controversy 
During a late night sitting of the Alberta Legislature, Premier Jason Kenney handed out earplugs to members of the United Conservative Party caucus while Dang was speaking. While the Kenney's press secretary called the move a "a harmless and light-hearted attempt to boost government caucus morale", the Alberta Federation of Labour deemed it "outrageous and insulting".

Community Advocacy

Racism and Refugees 
Throughout his political career, Dang has been a advocate on refugee and anti-racism issues. His parents were Chinese-Vietnamese refugees from Vietnam. He has spoken out against racism in politics in the Legislature and supported Vietnamese people who came to Alberta as refugees. Dang has criticized Jason Kenney for comparing his own emigration from Saskatchewan to refugee Canadians.

On March 22, Dang introduced a motion calling on the UCP government to ban "racist symbols and insignia" in public spaces as well as at demonstrations "meant to terrorize and promote racism". However, Dang accused the UCP government of using a debate on rodeo to run out the clock to avoid debate on his motion. Rallies had occurred across Alberta where some protestors carried tiki torches, widely considered a symbol of white supremacy. At least five Edmonton Muslim women and multiple Calgarians had been targeted in recent months.

Parody Account 
Dang was also the subject of a racist parody account linking him to North Korean dictator Kim Jong-un which was followed by multiple high-ranking UCP government staffers including Matt Wolf, Premier Jason Kenney's Executive Director of Issues Management. Dang stated that it was disappointing that while UCP MLAs were voting for his anti-racism motion, so many UCP staffers would be enjoying this racist content. The parody account was suspended by Twitter as of April 14, 2021.

Youth and Bullying 
Dang put forward Motion 503 in his first session as an MLA, urging the Government to consult with school boards and youth to encourage student participation on boards. This was aimed to increasing dialogue and student engagement on democratic governance. The motion was passed unanimously with bi-partisan support in the assembly. The motion read as follows:

Be it resolved that the Legislative Assembly urge the Government to consult with school boards and youth to encourage senior high school student participation on boards with a view to increasing dialogue, increasing student engagement in board policy and planning, and educating students about democratic governance.

Notice of Motion 507 was given on Day 2 of the second session on the order paper. This motion was aimed at ensuring that students and parents were ready to deal with all facets of bullying in an ever-evolving technological world. The notice of motion reads as follows:

Be it resolved that the Legislative Assembly urge the Government to take steps to increase awareness in Alberta's schools of the effects of cyberbullying.Motion 507 was passed unanimously with bi-partisan support in the assembly.

Tourism Week 
In spring 2016, Dang tabled Bill 204, The Alberta Tourism Week Act. This bill would create a tourism week in legislation that would occur in the first week of June starting 2017. The Bill has currently passed first and second reading in the Legislature.

Daylight Saving Time
In late 2016, Dang announced that he planned to table a bill to abolish Daylight Saving Time in Alberta. Dang said he had been working on this file since it had been brought up at an NDP policy convention. He has stated that he intends to lead a public consultation on the issue in advance of his bill in 2017. 

On February 13, 2017, Dang announced an online consultation process that would take place until the end of February. He received widespread support from young families and members of the agricultural industry. Egg farmers have cheered the proposal, because the time change “plays havoc with the natural rhythm of poultry.” Dang also announced that he hoped to have a bill ready to be tabled in mid-March.

Dang tabled Bill 203, the Alberta Standard Time Act on March 14, 2017. The bill would set the Alberta Standard Time to UTC−6. This was done after his online consultation showed that 82% of respondents prefer not changing their clocks twice a year, and 59% of respondents prefer to have daylight in the late afternoon.

In October 2017, the Alberta Legislature voted against Dang's bill to abolish the time change. This was due in part to pressure from industry groups such as the Oilers Entertainment Group and WestJet. The industries were concerned about the consequences of moving off time change while other jurisdictions continued to. Dang said that despite the vote he would like to continue the conversation and would support moving forward if other jurisdictions such as British Columbia and other parts of North America abolished time change as well.

COVID-19 
Dang has been an advocate throughout the COVID-19 pandemic in Alberta for more support for small business and families.

In October 2021, Dang called on Premier Jason Kenney to make vaccinations mandatory for all United Conservative MLAs and to remove any members who were unvaccinated from his caucus. Dang stated that it is imperative political leaders set the right example and get vaccinated. He introduced a motion that was ultimately unsuccessful in requiring proof of vaccination.

Resignation from NDP caucus and vaccine information hack 
On December 21, 2021, Dang resigned from the Alberta NDP caucus after an RCMP search of his home. According to NDP leader Rachael Notley, Dang offered his resignation as part of a "long-standing policy that members under active police investigation will not sit in the caucus". Dang responded to the search, saying it was related to "the vulnerabilities with the COVID-19 vaccination records on the Government of Alberta website", which he had investigated and disclosed to Alberta Health. The Alberta government website had been released in September 2021, and allowed Alberta residents to access their COVID-19 vaccination information by entering their health card number, birthday and month they were vaccinated.

In March 2022, Dang admitted to hacking the system, saying he had done so to highlight security vulnerabilities and pass on the information to the government. He described the hack as "well within the skill set of an amateur." In a white paper released on his website, Dang detailed his process, which first involved a fuzzing test. Dang then bypassed an IP address block by using a script that connected to the Tor network, which anonymized his connection. He then set out to test the vulnerability by entering Alberta premier Jason Kenney's birthdate and date of vaccination, which Dang later defended by saying the information was publicly available. His script was then able to guess a random health card number and retrieve a record belonging to an unknown individual. According to Dang, he then "immediately exited the website and did not save any information". After the hack, Dang contacted the NDP caucus, and the information was passed onto Alberta Health, with the vulnerability being fixed within weeks. Dang and the NDP's actions were criticized by UCP MLA and government whip Brad Rutherford, who said the party's "first instinct was to protect him, instead of being forthright with Albertans". 

In his white paper, Dang also criticized the Alberta government's lack of "basic" cybersecurity measures and called for the creation of a office dedicated to cyberdefence, along with a vulnerability disclosure program that encourages and rewards security researchers. The paper was later removed from his website.

In June 2022, the Alberta RCMP Cybercrime Investigative Team announced that Dang was charged with "illegally attempting to access private information contained in the Alberta Health vaccine portal" under the Alberta Health Information Act, a non-criminal charge that could result in a fine of up to $200,000. Unsealed court documents later showed that the RCMP were pursuing criminal charges against Dang at least until March 31, but later decided to charge him under the Health Information Act.  The documents also said that the Alberta vaccine information portal received 1.78 million requests using Kenney's birthdate shortly after its launch, which it characterized as a "brute force attack" from Dang.

On November 4, 2022, Dang pleaded guilty to a Health Information Act charge of illegally attempting to access private information. On November 29 he was sentenced to pay a fine of $7,200.

Government response and vulnerability disclosure program 
In June 2021, the Government of Alberta released their first annual cybersecurity update. This led to the "CyberAlberta" initiative which included a new public vulnerability disclosure program.

Response from industry and professionals 
Dang's decision to act alone also received criticism from NAIT cybersecurity chair John Zabiuk, who said that his actions were not consistent with those of an ethical hacker. However, other information security professionals like Brad Haines (better known as Renderman), have said that Dang's calls for improved cybersecurity oversight should be heard and that the RCMP response will likely have a chilling effect on ethical hackers. The methodology Dang used has been described as "common practice in the private sector" and experts have suggested Alberta should implement a bug bounty program without "[turning] a person's life upside down because he decided to become a whistleblower." Haines commented that he hoped "[we] will learn to thank someone like [Dang] rather than condemn him."

Personal life 
Dang played competitive table tennis as a junior for many years, competing across Canada and in the United States of America. He was a member of the Edmonton Table Tennis Club.

He also enjoys playing Ingress, an alternate reality game that involves physically going to different locations as part of the gameplay, with Dang stating that his earlier game-related travels to different parts of Alberta have been helpful since becoming an MLA in the province.

Electoral history

2019 general election

2015 general election

References

1995 births
Alberta New Democratic Party MLAs
Living people
Politicians from Edmonton
Canadian politicians of Chinese descent
University of Alberta alumni
21st-century Canadian politicians